Britany Anderson (born 3 January 2001) is a Jamaican athlete.

Career
Anderson, the 2017 world U18 champion, who won silver at the 2018 World Athletics U20 Championships,  twice broke the world U20 record of 12.84, which had been set by Cuba’s Aliuska Lopez in Zagreb on 16 July 1987, at the same meeting. First, Anderson clocked 12.79 in her heat.
She then bettered it as she ran 12.71 for the 100m hurdles on 24 July 2019, at the Motonet Grand Prix in Joensuu, Finland to set a new junior world record. This record was ratified on 11 September 2019. She was one of five finalists for the IAAF 2019 Female Rising Star Award.

She qualified to represent Jamaica at the 2020 Summer Olympics. 
In the semifinals of the 100 m hurdles at the 2020 Summer Olympics, she set a new personal best of 12.40, defeating Kendra Harrison. In the final, she hit a hurdle and finished in 8th place.
Anderson finished fourth in the 2022 World Indoor Athletics Championships in the 60m hurdles. At the 2022 World Athletics Championships in Eugene, Oregon Anderson won her heat to qualify for the semi finals as the fourth fastest overall before winning the silver medal in the final.

References

2001 births
Living people
Jamaican female hurdlers
Athletes (track and field) at the 2020 Summer Olympics
Olympic athletes of Jamaica
World Athletics Championships medalists
21st-century Jamaican women